Haavio is a surname. Notable people with the surname include:

Elina Haavio-Mannila (born 1933), Finnish social scientist
Martti Haavio (1899–1973), Finnish poet, folklorist, and mythologist

Finnish-language surnames